Caloptilia cataractias is a moth of the family Gracillariidae. It is known from South Africa, Namibia and Zimbabwe.

The larvae feed on Rhynchosia caribaea. They mine the leaves of their host plant. The first part of the mine has the form of a narrow gallery on the underside of the leaf, the second part is a much wider gallery.

References

cataractias
Lepidoptera of Namibia
Lepidoptera of South Africa
Lepidoptera of Zimbabwe
Moths of Sub-Saharan Africa
Moths described in 1921